Dushka is a village in Chernoochene Municipality, in Kardzhali Province, in southern-central Bulgaria. 

As of 2016 it had a population of only 3 people: two men and one female.

References

Villages in Kardzhali Province